Miller's rule or Miller rule may refer to:

Miller's Rule (optics), an empirical rule which gives an estimate of the order of magnitude of the nonlinear coefficient
Miller's rules, a set of rules in stellation
Miller twist rule, a mathematical formula created by Don Miller to calculate the optimum rate of twist for a given bullet traveling through a rifled barrel
Miller Rule or The Miller test, the United States Supreme Court's test for determining whether speech or expression can be labeled obscene